The Varlık Vergisi ("wealth tax" or "capital tax") was a tax mostly levied on non-Muslim citizens in Turkey in 1942, with the stated aim of raising funds for the country's defense in case of an eventual entry into World War II. The underlying reason for the tax was to inflict financial ruin on the minority non-Muslim citizens of the country, end their prominence in the country's economy and transfer the assets of non-Muslims to the Muslim bourgeoisie. It was a discriminatory measure which taxed non-Muslims up to ten times more heavily and resulted in a significant amount of wealth and property being  transferred to Muslims.

Background

The bill for the one-off tax was proposed by the Şükrü Saracoğlu government, and the act was adopted by the Turkish parliament on November 11, 1942. It was imposed on the fixed assets, such as landed estates, building owners, real estate brokers, businesses, and industrial enterprises of all citizens, but especially targeted the minorities. Those who suffered most severely were non-Muslims like Jews, Greeks, Armenians, Assyrians, some Kurds and Levantines, who controlled a large portion of the economy, though it was the Armenians who were most heavily taxed.

The tax was supposed to be paid by all citizens of Turkey, but inordinately higher rates were imposed on the country’s non-Muslim inhabitants, in an arbitrary and predatory way. Because those forced to pay the bulk of the taxes were exclusively non-Muslims, the law was perceived by the public as a resurrected “jizya - gavur tax” against them. The Ottoman Empire had only been dissolved twenty years earlier, and memories of the discriminatory practices of the late Ottoman era still weighed heavily on the collective consciousness of these minority groups. These taxes led to the destruction of the remaining non-Muslim merchant class in Turkey, the lives and finances of many non-Muslim families were ruined. The taxes were very high, some times higher than a person’s entire wealth.
In addition, the law was also applied to the many poor non-Muslims such as drivers, workers and even beggars, whereas their Muslim counterparts were not obliged to pay any tax.

The Varlık Vergisi resulted in a number of suicides of ethnic minority citizens in Istanbul.

During World War II, Turkey remained neutral until February 1945. Officially, the tax was devised to fill the state treasury that would have been needed had Nazi Germany or the Soviet Union invaded the country. However, the main reason for the tax was to nationalize the Turkish economy by reducing minority populations’ influence and control over the country’s trade, finance, and industries.

The tax could not be challenged in court. Non-Muslims had to pay their taxes within 15 days in cash. Many people who could not pay the taxes borrowed money from relatives and friends, also sold their properties at public auctions or sold their businesses to gather some money to pay. People who were unable to pay were sent to labor camps in eastern Anatolia.
Workers were paid for their service but half of their wages were set-off for their debts. Because of the hard plowing work elder obligors conspired with young villagers from Aşkale to make them work instead and they paid villagers daily wages in return.
Five thousand were sent there and all were non-Muslims, since the Muslim taxpayers who failed to pay received lighter sentences. Also, there were easiness for payments and tax discounts for the Muslims taxpayers. Although the law stipulated that people over fifty-five years old were exempt from labor service, elderly men, even sick people were sent there.
Twenty-one of the people who were sent to the labor camps died there and the Turkish government usurped their wealth and sold it to Turkish Muslims at extremely low prices, paving the way to the creation of some of the contemporary Turkish conglomerates.

The state also confiscated the property of the taxed person’s close relatives (including parents, parents-in-law, children, and siblings) and sold it to settle the tax amount, even if the person had been forced into labor service.

Foreign-passport residents in Turkey who gave in a tax return or owned a business were forced to pay a huge capital levy on supposed wealth too. However, none of them were ruined or committed suicide. The tax was not based on any reality, but just on a whim of the authorities. This provoked the intervention of foreign embassies and consulates on behalf of their nationals.

Taxpayers were classified into four separate lists, the “M” list, for Muslims, the “G”, for non-Muslims (‘’Gayrimuslim‘’), the “E”, for Foreigners (‘’Ecnebi’’) and the “D” for converts (‘’Dönme‘’).

The rigidly-enforced, discriminatory law did not yield the results the government had hoped for. Companies increased the prices of their products sharply to recoup their losses, creating a spiral of inflation that ruined low-income consumers.

However, according to official information, the Turkish government collected TL 324 million (at a time when 1 US dollar was equivalent to 1.20 Turkish lira) through the confiscation of non-Muslim assets. This amount would be equivalent to more than $4 billion in 2022. 

According to Faik Ökte, the director of finance for the province of Istanbul at the time of the Varlık Vergisi, the Turkish government collected TL 289,256,246 from non-Muslim minorities, TL 34,226,764 from dönme and TL 25,600,409 from Muslims.

During the period, the Turkish press allegedly had “anti-minority” articles and reports.

Repeal and aftermath
The law could not sustain relentless international criticism. Under pressure from the United Kingdom and the United States, it was repealed on 15 March 1944. After the abolition of the law, the minority citizens who were at the labour camps were sent back to their homes. The Turkish government promised to give back the paid taxes to non-Muslims, but it did not.

The opposition Democratic Party (DP) capitalized on its unpopularity in the general election of 1950, which was the first democratic general election in the Turkish Republic, thereby achieving a landslide victory against the Republican People's Party (CHP).

These taxes brought about a permanent demographic change within the minority population. Many people of the minorities, especially the Greek minority, felt that there was no future for them in Turkey and they left their ancestral homes and became refugees in Greece. On the other hand, some, especially from the Jewish community had managed to secrete assets abroad and they were able to restart a reduced and hesitant life in Turkey. The tax also resulted in state confiscation of much minority property in Istanbul, "Turkifying" not only the economy but also the landscape. The 1935 Census records non-Muslims as 1.98% of the population; by 1945, this had fallen to 1.54%.

In addition, the Varlık Vergisi once more demonstrated that being Muslim constituted a significant part of the definition of citizenship in Turkey.

The Varlık Vergisi in the way it was dealt with by the Turkish Press exemplifies the close relations between the Executive and the Press, in Turkey.

Furthermore, the tax made small businesses to close or sell their properties and stock to large operators, leaving the market under the control of big business interests.

In 1951, Faik Ökte published his memoirs. There he confessed that the tax had been applied in discriminatory way against the non-Muslims. The Turkish press condemned him for publishing this and declared him "traitor to the homeland".

Years after the introduction of the tax, the political elite of Turkey had difficulties coming to terms with the subject.

In popular culture
The historical novel Salkım Hanım'ın Taneleri (variously translated as Mrs. Salkım's Diamonds/Pearls/Beads/Necklace), written by Turkish author Yilmaz Karakoyunlu, recounts stories and witnesses of the non-Muslims during the Varlık Vergisi. 
The same novel was turned into a film of the same name, Mrs. Salkım's Diamonds. Members of parliament, such as Ahmet Çakar (MHP), were outraged at the screening. 
The Netflix series The Club revolves around a Jewish woman who was victimized by the tax and its aftermath.

See also 
Taxation of the Jews in Europe for other types of taxes imposed on the Jews
Jizya
Dhimmi
Confiscated Armenian properties in Turkey
Anti-Armenian sentiment in Turkey
Istanbul pogrom (1955)
Mrs. Salkım's Diamonds (movie)
The Club
Racism in Turkey
The Twenty Classes
İbrahim Süreyya Yiğit
Judenvermögensabgabe, a similar tax targeting wealthy Jews

References

Further reading

1942 in Turkey
1942 in law
Anti-Armenianism in Turkey
Antisemitism in Turkey
Discrimination in Turkey
Greeks in Turkey
History of the Republic of Turkey
Taxation in Turkey
Turkish words and phrases
Economic history of Turkey
Persecution of Christians in Turkey
Property taxes